Pagan reaction is reversal of Christianization. It may refer to:

Pagan reaction in Rome  under emperor Julian the Apostate (4th century)
Pagan reaction in England under Eadbald of Kent (7th century)
Pagan reaction in Poland (1030s)
Pagan reaction in Lithuania (1260s)